Bolder Media (also known as Bolder Media for Boys and Girls or Bolder Media, Inc.) was an American production company that was a joint venture between Frederator Studios and Mixed Media Group. 

Founded in 2002 by television producers Susan Miller and Fred Seibert for the development of books, television series, and movies for children. It produced Bob Boyle's animated preschool series Wow! Wow! Wubbzy!, as the only show the company produced. Along with Wow! Wow! Wubbzy!, the company has also produced the show's books that have been published by Scholastic and other publishers.

References

Frederator Studios
Mass media companies of the United States
Mass media companies established in 2002
Mass media companies disestablished in 2010
Entertainment companies of the United States
2002 establishments in the United States
2010 disestablishments in the United States
2010 disestablishments in California